Atlantic City (French: Atlantic City, USA) is a 1980 romantic-gangster film directed by Louis Malle, and starring Burt Lancaster, Susan Sarandon, Kate Reid, Robert Joy, Hollis McLaren, Michel Piccoli and Al Waxman. A Canadian-French co-production  filmed in late 1979, it was released in France and Germany in September 1980 and in the United States later that year by Paramount Pictures. The script was written by John Guare.

The film opened to critical acclaim and was nominated for the Big Five Academy Awards: Best Picture, Best Director, Best Actor (for Lancaster), Best Actress (for Sarandon), and Best Original Screenplay, but did not win in any category. In Canada, it won Genie Awards for Best Performance by a Foreign Actress (for Sarandon), Best Supporting Actress (for Reid), and Best Art Direction, with three additional nominations. In France, it was nominated for the César Awards for Best Original Screenplay and Best Music.

In 2003, Atlantic City was among the 25 motion pictures added annually to the United States National Film Registry of the Library of Congress, being deemed "culturally, historically, or aesthetically significant" and recommended for preservation.

Plot
Sally Matthews is a young waitress from Saskatchewan, working at an oyster bar in an Atlantic City casino. She has dreams of becoming a blackjack dealer, going through dealer training under the tutelage of Joseph. Joseph, from France, encourages her to learn French and become a dealer in Monte Carlo.

Sally's estranged husband Dave and her pregnant sister Chrissie show up one day with the intention of selling a $10,000 bag of cocaine he had stolen in Philadelphia. Sally is outraged to see him, as he had impregnated Chrissie and run off with her. Dave meets Lou, an aging former gangster who lives in Sally's apartment building and runs a small time numbers game in poor areas of the city; Lou also acts as a caretaker for Grace, a seemingly bedridden, aging beauty queen whose gangster husband he used to work under, and who constantly berates and demeans him. Dave convinces Lou to sell the cocaine for him, but as Lou sells the first batch to Alfie, who runs an illegal poker game in a hotel room, Dave is attacked and killed by the mobsters from whom he had stolen the drugs.

Lou is left with the remaining cocaine and continues to sell it to impress Sally, whom he has long pined for, with money. Sally and Lou make love one day, but she returns to her apartment to find it trashed; she has been tracked down by Dave's killers, who beat her to find out if she has the drugs. They leave, but Lou laments not being able to protect her. Grace also reveals that Lou was a small-time crook and nowhere near as competent as he pretends.

Sally is fired from the casino when her late husband's criminal record is discovered. Lou sells most of the remainder of the cocaine, while both Sally and the mobsters discover Lou's affiliation with Dave. The mobsters corner them one night, but are killed when Lou produces a gun and shoots them. He and Sally then steal their car and leave Atlantic City. That night, from a motel, they watch the TV news reporting on the killing. A police sketch of the suspect is shown. It looks nothing like Lou. Lou is overjoyed with relief and pride. He confesses to Sally that this was the first time he has ever killed anyone.

At the motel the next morning, Lou takes the phone to the bathroom to call Grace and brag about the killings. Sally wakes and takes half of the money with the intention of sneaking off; Lou witnesses this, allowing her to leave and giving her the car keys so she can escape to France, rather than go to Miami with him. Lou returns to Atlantic City to be with Grace. Working together, they sell the remaining portion of the cocaine and walk off arm in arm with renewed respect for each other.

Cast

Production

Atlantic City was filmed on location in and around Atlantic City and South Jersey, Philadelphia, and New York City. Although filmed in the United States, the film was a co-production between companies based in France and Canada. Aside from Burt Lancaster, Susan Sarandon, and local extras, most of the cast originated from Canada or France. The film allowed Canadian actors such as Al Waxman to successfully transition into American film and television roles.

The production companies allotted Louis Malle the money to make a film with the stipulation that it be made before the year 1979 ended. Malle had a difficult time finding the right script to direct and with time running out his then girlfriend Susan Sarandon suggested using a story written by her friend John Guare, a playwright most notable for his plays House of Blue Leaves and Six Degrees of Separation. Guare suggested that the story take place in Atlantic City, which was still for the most part suffering from the urban deterioration that prompted the legalization of gambling as a solution to save the city. The three met over dinner in early 1979 to work out quirks in the script and began shooting within a few months.

Principal photography commenced on October 31, 1979, and was largely finished by December 30 (although a few exterior and location shots were filmed until January 5, 1980). Malle filmed at an opportune time in that he was able to capture old Atlantic City: gambling was still in its early stages there, with only two casino hotels open (Resorts and Caesars; Bally's Park Place opened on December 30 toward the end of the principal photography). Most of the city's old resorts and entertainment piers were still standing, albeit in a severe state of disrepair. Within a couple of years of the filming, most of these old hotels would fall victim to the wrecking ball as they were replaced with new casinos. To frame the picture, Malle foreshadows the great transition of the famous resort town in the opening credits by featuring footage of the implosion of the once-grand and historic Traymore Hotel on the Atlantic City Boardwalk.

Louis Malle hired composer Michel Legrand to write a score for the film, which he did. In the end, however, Malle decided against using a score for the film, and opted for all the music in the film to be diegetic: the only music used is that which exists in the world of the characters (i.e. radios, musical instruments, etc.).  The music that Susan Sarandon's character plays from her tape player is the aria "Casta Diva" from Vincenzo Bellini's opera Norma.

Filming locations
The opening shot of the old Traymore Hotel being demolished is shown to convey the notion that the city's old hotels were being demolished to make way for the new casinos. However, the Traymore was in fact demolished in 1972, years before the gambling referendum passed in New Jersey. The referendum passed in 1976 and the first hotel to open up was Resorts, formerly the Chalfonte-Haddon Hall, in 1978.

When Dave and Chrissie are seen hitchhiking into Atlantic City from Philadelphia, they pass a large model elephant on their way into town. The elephant, named Lucy, was a tourist attraction built in 1881 to lure potential land buyers to South Atlantic City (now called Margate), a small town south of Atlantic City. The model elephant had been left to deteriorate over the years; on the brink of its demolition in 1971, the residents of Margate had raised the money to have it restored. Today, Lucy still stands in Margate and is on the National Register of Historic Places.

The club where Dave and Lou meet was Club Harlem, which opened in 1935 on Kentucky Avenue, and became the premier nightclub for black tourists visiting Atlantic City. The club opened and closed frequently from 1968 on and eventually closed forever at the end of the eighties. It was torn down in 1992.

Scenes also were shot in the Knife and Fork Restaurant and White House Subs, both landmarks in Atlantic City.

Awards and nominations

Notes

References

External links

 
 
 
 
 
 "Atlantic City", essay by Daniel Eagan in America's Film Legacy: The Authoritative Guide to the Landmark Movies in the National Film Registry, A&C Black, 2010 , pages 765–767

1980 films
1980s English-language films
1980s French-language films
Canadian crime drama films
1980 crime drama films
Films directed by Louis Malle
Films set in Atlantic City, New Jersey
Films shot in Atlantic City, New Jersey
Golden Lion winners
1980 romantic drama films
United States National Film Registry films
Films about old age
Films whose director won the Best Direction BAFTA Award
Films about gambling
Films about drugs
Films produced by John Kemeny
Films scored by Michel Legrand
English-language French films
English-language Canadian films
National Society of Film Critics Award for Best Film winners
Romantic crime films
1980s Canadian films
Canadian gangster films
1980 multilingual films
Canadian multilingual films
French multilingual films
Foreign films set in the United States